Karuzi Province is one of the 18 provinces of Burundi.

Six mass graves with 6,032 bodies were found by Burundi's Truth and Reconciliation Commission in Karuzi Province in January and February 2020. Some of the victims were identified by clothes and rosaries.

Communes
It is divided administratively into the following communes:

 Commune of Bugenyuzi
 Commune of Buhiga
 Commune of Gihogazi
 Commune of Gitaramuka
 Commune of Mutumba
 Commune of Nyabikere
 Commune of Shombo

References

 
Provinces of Burundi